Mezobromelia magdalenae, synonym Cipuropsis magdalenae, is a species of flowering plant in the family Bromeliaceae, native to Colombia. It was first described by Lyman Bradford Smith in 1963 as Vriesea magdalenae.

References

magdalenae
Flora of Colombia
Plants described in 1963